Péter Kusztor (born 27 December 1984 in Budapest) is a Hungarian racing cyclist, who currently rides for UCI ProTeam . He competed at the road race at the 2008 Summer Olympics finishing 65th. Kusztor won the 2010 and 2012 national road cycling championships.

Major results

2005
 National Road Championships
1st  Under-23 time trial
3rd Time trial
2007
 2nd Overall Grand Prix Cycliste de Gemenc
1st Prologue
 2nd Overall Tour of Szeklerland
1st Prologue
 7th Belgrade–Banja Luka I
 10th Gran Premio San Giuseppe
2008
 1st GP Hydraulika Mikolasek
 1st Grand Prix Bradlo
 1st GP  2000
 2nd Overall Okolo Slovenska
 5th Trofeo Zsšdi
 5th Grand Prix Kooperativa
 9th Overall The Paths of King Nikola
 9th Prague–Karlovy Vary–Prague
2009
 3rd Overall Grand Prix Guillaume Tell
 3rd Giro del Mendrisiotto
 3rd Tour du Jura
 5th Grand Prix Kooperativa
 5th Raiffeisen Grand Prix
 8th Overall Flèche du Sud
 9th Overall Grand Prix Cycliste de Gemenc
 10th Overall Okolo Slovenska
2010
 National Road Championships
1st  Time trial
1st  Road race
 2nd Giro del Mendrisiotto
 6th Overall Tour de Bretagne
2011
 1st  Overall Tour de Bretagne
 3rd Road race, National Road Championships
 6th Overall Tour Alsace
 7th Grand Prix de la ville de Nogent-sur-Oise
2012
 1st  Road race, National Road Championships
 7th Giro del Veneto
2013
 3rd Time trial, National Road Championships
 4th Overall Sibiu Cycling Tour
 4th Overall Tour of Szeklerland
 7th Race Horizon Park 2
 7th Grand Prix Královéhradeckého kraje
 10th Central European Tour Miskolc GP
2014
 National Road Championships
2nd Road race
3rd Time trial
2015
 2nd Road race, National Road Championships
 6th Overall East Bohemia Tour
 7th Rund um Sebnitz
 8th Raiffeisen Grand Prix
2016
 1st Stage 4 Grand Prix Cycliste de Gemenc
 3rd Time trial, National Road Championships
2017
 2nd Overall Grand Prix Cycliste de Gemenc
 9th GP Laguna
2018
 1st V4 Special Series Debrecen–Ibrány
 7th Overall Grand Prix Cycliste de Gemenc
2020
 10th Overall International Tour of Rhodes

References

External links
 
 

1984 births
Living people
Hungarian male cyclists
Cyclists at the 2008 Summer Olympics
Olympic cyclists of Hungary
Cyclists from Budapest
People with type 1 diabetes